Campo de O'Donnell was a multi-use stadium in Madrid, Spain. It was initially a field (campo) in the area of O'Donnell, next to the main boulevard called Calle de O'Donnell. It became the home stadium of Real Madrid in 1912. The capacity of the stadium was 5,000 spectators. In 1923, Real Madrid moved on to Campo de Ciudad Lineal, and Campo de O'Donnell was closed. 

Campo de O'Donnell hosted four Copa del Rey finals, in 1908, 1909, 1913 and 1918.

References

External links
Estadios de España 

Odonnell
Real Madrid CF
Former sports venues in Madrid
Sports venues completed in 1912
1912 establishments in Spain
1923 disestablishments in Spain